The University of California Education Abroad Program (UCEAP) is the official systemwide study abroad program available to University of California (UC) students and international students from countries outside the United States. UCEAP partners with the UC Office of the President, faculty and study abroad offices at each UC campus, and host institutions throughout the world to provide study abroad programs of UC quality. The Systemwide Office is located in Goleta near the University of California, Santa Barbara.

Since 1962, the University of California Education Abroad Program (UCEAP) has served nearly 100,000 UC students across all 10 campuses and over 32,000 international exchange students.

UCEAP By the Numbers 
Facts as of January, 2015:
 Study abroad students 91,123
 International exchange students: 32,279
 Total UCEAP alumni: 123,402
 Countries: 42
 Programs: 382
 Universities: 120
 Languages: 45

Program options 
As of January 2015, UCEAP has programs established in the following countries: Argentina, Australia, Barbados, Botswana, Brazil, Canada, Chile, China, Costa Rica, Czech Republic, Denmark, Dominican Republic, Egypt, France, Germany, Ghana, Hong Kong, India, Indonesia, Ireland, Israel, Italy, Japan, Jordan, Korea, Mexico, the Netherlands, New Zealand, Russia (currently suspended), Singapore, South Africa, Spain, Sweden, Switzerland, Taiwan, Thailand, Turkey, the United Kingdom, and Vietnam.

UCEAP offers a comprehensive range of study abroad programs that let UC students learn a new language, intern with an international business or Nongovernmental Organization, conduct research, travel and live in multiple locations, attend classes with local students, and take courses that help them advance in their major.

UCEAP programs are unique among study abroad programs in that all programs are approved by and integrated with the University of California.

External links 
 
 UCEAP Changed Me
 Unofficial practical guide to the Education Abroad Reciprocity Program
 The Californian Abroad, official UCEAP blog

University of California, Santa Barbara
Study abroad programs